Agapanthia irrorata is a species of beetle in the subfamily Lamiinae, found in North Africa, Southern Europe (including Portugal and Spain). The species is of black colour, with yellowish-white dots. Their flight is from April to June. They are polyphagous and feed on various herbaceous plants, including Carduus, Daucus, Ferula, Onopordum and Salvia species.

References

irrorata
Beetles described in 1787
Beetles of Europe